All That Glue is a compilation album by British electronic music duo Sleaford Mods. It was released on 15 May 2020 on the Rough Trade label.

The album cover depicts Marcel Duchamp's readymade sculpture Fountain from 1917.

Critical reception
All That Glue was met with "universal acclaim" reviews from critics. At Metacritic, which assigns a weighted average rating out of 100 to reviews from mainstream publications, this release received an average score of 82, based on 6 reviews.

Track listing

Note: The album contains the 2013 version of “Jobseeker”. The original version (based on a sample of The Yardbirds' hit “For Your Love”) can be found on the album The Mekon from 2008.

Note: The album contains the slow version of “No One's Bothered”. The original version can be found on the album Key Markets.

Charts

References

2020 compilation albums
Sleaford Mods albums
Rough Trade Records compilation albums